Ivachevo is a rural locality (a village) in Fominskoye Rural Settlement, Gorokhovetsky District, Vladimir Oblast, Russia. The population was 72 as of 2010. There are 4 streets.

Geography 
Ivachevo is located 51 km southwest of Gorokhovets (the district's administrative centre) by road. Rozhdestveno is the nearest rural locality.

References 

Rural localities in Gorokhovetsky District